Throbbing Gristle were an English music and visual arts group formed in 1975 in Kingston upon Hull by Genesis P-Orridge, Cosey Fanni Tutti, Peter Christopherson, and Chris Carter. They are widely regarded as pioneers of industrial music. Evolving from the experimental performance art group COUM Transmissions, Throbbing Gristle made their public debut in October 1976 on COUM exhibition Prostitution, and released their debut single "United/Zyklon B Zombie" and debut album The Second Annual Report the following year. Lyrical themes mainly revolved around mysticism, extremist political ideologies, sexuality, dark or underground aspects of society, and idiosyncratic manipulation of language.

The band released several subsequent studio and live albums—including D.o.A: The Third and Final Report of Throbbing Gristle (1978), 20 Jazz Funk Greats (1979), and Heathen Earth (1980)—on their own record label Industrial Records, building a reputation with their transgressive and confrontational aesthetics; they included the extensive use of disturbing visual imagery (such as ironic fascist and Nazi symbolism and pornography), as well as that of sound manipulation (noise and pre-recorded tape-based samples) influenced by works of William S. Burroughs and Brion Gysin.

Throbbing Gristle dissolved in 1981 due to interpersonal differences; the individual members went on to participate in other projects, such as Psychic TV, Coil, and Chris & Cosey. The band was reformed in 2004, and released three more studio albums—TG Now (2004), Part Two (2007), and The Third Mind Movements (2009)—before disbanding again after P-Orridge's departure and Christopherson's death in November 2010. P-Orridge later died in March 2020. The band's final studio project, a cover version of the 1970 Nico album Desertshore titled The Desertshore Installation, was released in 2012 under the moniker X-TG.

History

First era: 1976–1981 

Throbbing Gristle evolved from the performance art group COUM Transmissions, formed in Kingston upon Hull by a group of performers including Genesis P-Orridge and Cosey Fanni Tutti. The last known performance of COUM Transmissions—Prostitution, an exhibition held in October 1976 at the Institute of Contemporary Arts—was also the public debut of Throbbing Gristle.

Throbbing Gristle's confrontational live performances and use of often disturbing imagery, including pornography and photographs of Nazi concentration camps, earned the group a notorious reputation, but they maintained that their mission was to challenge and explore the darker and obsessive sides of the human condition rather than to make attractive music. Throbbing Gristle made extensive use of pre-recorded tape-based samples and special effects to produce a distinctive, highly distorted background, usually accompanied by lyrics or spoken-word performances by Tutti or P-Orridge. Though they asserted that they wanted to provoke their audience into thinking for themselves rather than pushing any specific agenda (as evidenced by the song "Don't Do as You're Told, Do as You Think" on Heathen Earth), Throbbing Gristle frequently associated with the anarchist punk scene. They appeared in the fanzine Toxic Grafity, with a condensation of their own propaganda parody series, Industrial News.

In 1977, they released their debut single "United / Zyklon B Zombie", followed by the album The Second Annual Report. Although pressed in a limited initial run of 786 copies on the band's Industrial Records label, it was rereleased on Mute Records following high demand; however, this later release was reversed, with all tracks playing backwards and in reverse order. This was followed by a series of albums, singles and live performances over a four-year period.

In 1981, Michael Sheppard, concert promoter and founder of Transparency Record label, brought Throbbing Gristle to Los Angeles. On 29 May 1981, Throbbing Gristle performed at the Kezar Pavilion in San Francisco in what would be the group's last performance until 2004. Throbbing Gristle announced their dissolution on 23 June 1981, mailing out postcards declaring that their "mission is terminated." In a 1987 interview, Tutti attributed the band's split to her own breakup with P-Orridge, saying, "TG broke up because me and Gen broke up."

P-Orridge and Peter Christopherson went on to form Psychic TV, and Tutti and Chris Carter continued to record together under the names of Chris & Cosey, Carter Tutti and Creative Technology Institute. Christopherson participated in Psychic TV's first releases, and later joined John Balance in the latter project Coil. P-Orridge subsequently formed Thee Majesty and PTV3 with the help of his wife Jacqueline "Jaye" Breyer.

Second era: 2004–2010 

In 2004, Throbbing Gristle briefly reunited to record and release the limited album TG Now. On 2 April 2007, TG released the album Part Two, which the group had finished recording in Berlin. It was originally set to be released by Mute Records in September 2006 but was delayed for unknown reasons.

In March 2007, Side-Line announced Part Two's final release date, adding that a string of special live events would take place in 2007.

A seven-disc DVD set titled TGV was issued in 2007. The set contains old and new footage of the band. TGV came packaged in a deluxe box with a 64-page book, all designed by Christopherson.

The group performed a reinterpretation of their debut album The Second Annual Report twice in 2008 to mark 30 years since its original release. The performance in Paris on 6 June was issued as a limited-edition framed vinyl set titled The Thirty-Second Annual Report, limited to 777 copies (though some sources claim that there were 785).

Throbbing Gristle worked to record an album based on their interpretation of Nico's album Desertshore. The group issued the entirety of the recording sessions for the album as a limited edition 12-CD set packaged in a custom CD wallet, The Desertshore Installation, which sold out via mail order from the group's website.

In April 2009, Throbbing Gristle toured the United States, appearing at the Coachella Valley Music and Arts Festival and in Los Angeles, New York, San Francisco and Chicago. The Third Mind Movements, a new release, was made available at these shows, which was edited from jams recorded during the Desertshore sessions.

A collaboration with Cerith Wyn Evans titled A=P=P=A=R=I=T=I=O=N was displayed at Tramway, Glasgow from 7 August to 27 September 2009. Throbbing Gristle contributed a multi-channel soundtrack that was played through 16 hanging Audio Spotlight sound panels that Evans had incorporated into his sculpture.

In November 2009, Throbbing Gristle and Industrial Records released their version of the Buddha Machine, titled Gristleism. It was designed by Throbbing Gristle and Christiaan Virant based on FM3's design. Gristleism offers more loops and almost twice the frequency range of the Buddha Machine. The player comes in three colours: black, chrome and red.

On 29 October 2010, Throbbing Gristle announced on their website that P-Orridge had informed them that they were no longer willing to perform with Throbbing Gristle and would be returning to their home in New York. Carter, Cosey and Christopherson finished the tour under the name X-TG.

P-Orridge's website stated that they had not quit Throbbing Gristle and had merely stopped participating on the current tour; it also said that an explanation would be released when all things were cleared up. However, on 24 November 2010, Christopherson died in his sleep at the age of 55, and the band subsequently dissolved.

Third era: 2011–present 

In 2011, Industrial Records had an official "re-activation", as TG's contract with Mute Records had expired. Because TG has disbanded following the death of Christopherson, the label's plan is to re-release the original TG albums (The Second Annual Report, D.o.A: The Third and Final Report, 20 Jazz Funk Greats, Heathen Earth and Greatest Hits) on the label. Originally intended to be released on 26 September 2011, they had to delay due to a Sony DADC warehouse fire in London. The plan changed to issue each album chronologically once per week starting on Halloween 2011 with The Second Annual Report and ending 28 November with Greatest Hits.

Industrial Records announced that a double album, titled Desertshore/The Final Report, would be released on 26 November 2012. Chris and Cosey produced the album, with the participation of guest vocalists Anohni (from Antony and the Johnsons), Blixa Bargeld (from Einstürzende Neubauten), Marc Almond (from Soft Cell), film director Gaspar Noé and former pornography star Sasha Grey.

A group decision had been made before Christopherson's death that the album would be recorded afresh because they were not satisfied with the ICA recordings. Christopherson had been the driving force behind the project and had been working on the record in Bangkok with Danny Hyde, even getting custom instruments made to use for the album. "It was Sleazy's project, then Cosey and Sleazy's, then I came in on it", Carter said in an interview with The Quietus. After Christopherson died, the Desertshore instruments were given to Carter and Cosey, and they began combining the recordings he had been making with the work they had done themselves. They announced plans to debut the album live at AV Festival on 17 March 2012 accompanied by a screening of Philippe Garrel's film The Inner Scar "for which Desertshore was the soundtrack and inspiration".

On 14 March 2020, P-Orridge died.

Legacy 
The band is widely viewed as having created the industrial music genre, along with contemporaries Cabaret Voltaire. The term was coined in the mid-1970s with the founding of Industrial Records by Genesis P-Orridge and Monte Cazazza; on Throbbing Gristle's debut album The Second Annual Report, they coined the slogan "industrial music for industrial people". The first wave of this music appeared with Throbbing Gristle and Cabaret Voltaire.

Alternative Press included Throbbing Gristle in their 1996 list of "100 underground inspirations of the past 20 years."

Wreckers of Civilization, a survey on COUM Transmissions and Throbbing Gristle's original run written by Simon Ford, was published in 1999; its title is a reference to the Prostitution exhibition controversy.

Other, Like Me: The Oral History of COUM Transmissions and Throbbing Gristle, a documentary on both projects consisting of archival footage and photos and interviews with their members, was co-produced by BBC Television and aired on BBC Four in December 2021.

Cover versions
Artists which covered songs by Throbbing Gristle include Marc Almond, Esplendor Geométrico, Peaches, The Horrorist, Merzbow,  Electrosexual/Hanin Elias, NON, Der Blutharsch, Propaganda and others.

Members 
 Genesis P-Orridge – bass guitar, violin, vocals, guitar (1976–1981, 2004–2010; died 2020)
 Cosey Fanni Tutti – guitars, cornet, vocals, tapes (1976–1981, 2004–2010)
 Peter Christopherson – tapes, sampler, found sounds, cornet, electronics (1976–1981, 2004–2010; died 2010)
 Chris Carter – synthesizers, tapes, electronics, programming (1976–1981, 2004–2010)

Discography 

During Throbbing Gristle's extensive career they have released numerous volumes of music including studio albums, live releases as well as box sets.

Studio albums

 The Second Annual Report (1977)
 D.o.A: The Third and Final Report of Throbbing Gristle (1978)
 20 Jazz Funk Greats (1979)
 Journey Through a Body (1982)
 CD1 (untitled) (1986)
 TG Now (2004)
 Part Two: The Endless Not (2007)
 The Third Mind Movements (2009)
 Desertshore / The Final Report (2012) (as X-TG)

References

Further reading

External links 

 

Cassette culture 1970s–1990s
Ableton Live users
British industrial music groups
British electronic musicians
British experimental musical groups
English post-punk music groups
Dark ambient music groups
Musical groups from London
Musical groups established in 1975
Musical groups disestablished in 1981
Musical groups reestablished in 2004
Musical groups disestablished in 2011
Noise musical groups
Performance artist collectives
Industrial Records artists